Henricus platanillanus is a species of moth of the family Tortricidae. It is found in San Luis Potosí, Mexico.

The wingspan is about 11 mm. The ground colour of the forewings is olive cream with grey and ochreous suffusions and spots. The hindwings are dark greyish brown.

Etymology
The species name refers to the type locality, El Platanillo, San Luis Potosí.

References

Moths described in 2007
Henricus (moth)